Blue Origin NS-23 was an uncrewed sub-orbital spaceflight mission, operated by Blue Origin, which launched on 12 September 2022. The booster failed during max q about a minute after launch, triggering the launch escape system which removed the capsule from the booster. The capsule landed successfully, while the booster was destroyed upon impact with the ground.

Flight
The flight involved the capsule RSS H. G. Wells and the propulsion module Tail 3, forming the New Shepard stack. The vehicle was originally intended to launch on 31 August but was grounded by bad weather, first to 1 September and then to 12 September.

As the rocket begun to tilt the launch escape system was triggered by the booster failure, pushing the capsule away from the booster. The flight was uncrewed, but the same booster design is used on Blue Origin's commercial flights carrying passengers.

As the launch escape system was triggered Blue Origin's live launch commentary went silent, before saying "It appears we’ve experienced an anomaly with today’s flight. This wasn’t planned". Blue Origin later tweeted "Booster failure on today’s uncrewed flight. Escape system performed as designed".

The flight was the first complete mission failure of the New Shepard vehicle, and the second in-flight anomaly after NS-1, where the booster crashed upon landing, with the capsule landing safely. This was the fourth time the abort motor has been used, and only time outside of testing. The three previous times were a pad abort test, an in flight abort test at max q (NS-5), and an in flight test at high altitude (NS-9).

Payload 
NS-23 was the twenty-third flight of the New Shepard vehicle, and the first time the vehicle failed to reach outer space as expected. On board were thirty-six payloads, including eighteen funded by NASA's Flight Opportunities program. Blue Origin expects that the majority of the payloads survived due to the backup safety systems, although two payloads attached to the outside of the capsule, including JANUS-APL, are predicted to have been destroyed.

Response
The Federal Aviation Administration grounded the New Shepard vehicles while it conducts an investigation into "whether any system, process, or procedure related to the mishap affected public safety", noting that the investigation is standard procedure. The chairman of the United States House Science Subcommittee on Space and Aeronautics, Don Beyer, issued a statement, saying that it was a "compelling reminder of the risks of spaceflight".

The incident is expected to cause scheduling delays for Blue Origin, as engineers attempt to identify the cause of the failure and correct it; the New Shepard class will not be permitted to fly again until the FAA sign off on their findings.

On September 15, leaders of the United States House Science Subcommittee on Space and Aeronautics called for more transparency from the FAA due to the lack of details regarding the abort. As New Shepard flies humans, the accident would have endangered lives had there been passengers onboard. The request for transparency included keeping members of the subcommittee up to date with the investigation, the root cause of the accident once it was determined, and actions to address the cause.

See also
Soyuz 18a
Soyuz T-10a
STS-51-F
STS-51-L
Soyuz MS-10

References 

2022 in spaceflight
2022 in Texas
Aviation accidents and incidents in the United States in 2022
New Shepard missions